Bernd Herbert Schmitt is a professor of international business in the marketing department at Columbia Business School, Columbia University in New York. He is known for his research, books, speaking and consulting on customer experience, customer happiness, branding and innovation and for his work in Asia on Asian markets and consumers. He wrote several influential books in these areas like Experiential Marketing, Customer Experience Management, Big Think Strategy and Happy Customers Everywhere.

He holds a PhD in Psychology from Cornell University and joined Columbia in 1988. In 2011, he also became the Executive Director of the Institute on Asian Consumer Insight (ACI) in Singapore, funded by the Singapore Economic Development Board (EDB) and Nanyang Technological University (NTU).

Schmitt has done research, teaching and consulting in many parts of the world, especially in Asia. From 1996–2000, he was the head of marketing at The China Europe International Business School (CEIBS) in Shanghai and held the first marketing chair ever in China. He has also held visiting appointments and short-term teaching appointments at M.I.T, the University of Michigan, Yonsei University in South Korea, Hong Kong University, the Hong Kong University of Science and Technology, the University of Munich in Germany and Jagiellonian University in Poland.

Life and career 
Schmitt was born in Heidelberg, Germany, where he attended high school and the University of Heidelberg, studying psychology. He went to Cornell University as an exchange student and later received a PhD in psychology. He joined Columbia University in 1988 and first taught courses in consumer behavior and advertising management. Later he taught marketing strategy and a popular course in branding. The branding course is also offered every year as a seminar during the Oktoberfest in Munich.

In the 1990s, he became interested in Chinese and Asian markets and consumers. He first visited China in 1991 and taught consumer behavior in Beijing at CEMI, a predecessor of CEIBS. He published articles on Chinese consumers and Chinese market segmentation. He also began his research, with other authors, like Shi Zhang, Yigang Pan, and Nader Tavassoli, on comparing Western and Asian languages. In 1996, he was appointed as the head of the marketing department at CEIBS and held the first marketing chair in China.

In the late 1990s, he began authoring books on customer experience like Experiential Marketing and Customer Experience Management.

In 1999, he became the director of the Center on Global Brand Leadership at Columbia Business School, which runs the annual Brite conference.

From 2000–2010, he spent a sabbatical at the University of Munich, Germany and also taught courses in South Korea and Singapore. He also was a frequent keynote speaker at conferences worldwide. He was featured among the Thinkers 50. He was on the marketing boards of Volkswagen AG and Samsung Electronics USA.

In 2011, he moved to Singapore to become the Executive Director of ACI – a new institute focused on Asian markets and consumers.

Contributions to marketing and management 
Schmitt is widely known for his contributions to customer experience, brand management and innovative marketing. Experiential Marketing: How to Get Customers to Sense, Feel, Think, Act and Relate to Your Company and Brands introduced the concept of customer experience to marketing and brand management. Customer Experience Management provides a step-by-step framework for managing experiences. Big Think Strategy has methods and tools for innovative marketing. Happy Customers Everywhere provides management methods to delight customers and make them happy.

He often uses psychological concepts in his writings and applies them to marketing and business. His books have many case studies and also examples from opera and the arts. Experiential Marketing and Customer Experience Management use theories from sensory, cognitive and social psychology. Happy Customers Everywhere is influenced by Positive Psychology.

Schmitt authored and co-authored more than 60 articles in academic marketing, management and psychology journals. He did research on consumer attitudes, innovation and language in cross-cultural contexts (comparing Asian and western languages). His books have been translated into more than 20 languages.

Research and work in Asia 
Schmitt has been researching, consulting and lecturing in Asia since 1991. He has written case studies on Asian companies including Korean companies Samsung, Yuan-Kimberly, Seoul Philharmonic Orchestra; Mary Kay in Shanghai and various Chinese companies such as Jahwa Corporation, Shanghai Venus Software and Shanghai Petrochemical.

He has held the first marketing chair in China. He has had visiting appointments at HKUST and Hong Kong University, CEIBS in Shanghai, Yonsei University in Seoul (South Korea), and at Singapore Management University.

Schmitt has consulted for Asian companies such as Sony, Sunstar, ADK in Japan; Samsung, Lotte, Amore Pacific, Hanjin in South Korea, Wheelock in Hong Kong and Tata Industries in India.

In 2011, he became the inaugural Executive Director of ACI. ACI organizes the Asia Consumer Summit, together with the Financial Times.

Publications 

 Schmitt, B. (2012). Happy customers everywhere. How your business can benefit from the insights from positive psychology. New York: Palgrave.
 Schmitt, B. (2007). Big think strategy: How to leverage bold ideas and leave small thinking behind. Boston: Harvard Business Press.
 Schmitt, B. and Mangold, M. (2004). Kundenerlebnis als Wettbewerbsvorteil: Mit CEM Marken und Märkte gestalten. Wiesbaden: Gabler Verlag.
 Schmitt, B. (2003). Customer experience management: A revolutionary approach to connecting with your customers. New York: Wiley.
 Schmitt, B., Rogers, D. and Vrotsos, K. (2003). There's no business that's not show business: Marketing in an experience culture. Englewood-Cliffs, NJ: Prentice-Hall Financial Times.
 Schmitt, B. (2001). Build your own garage: Blueprints and tools to unleash your company's hidden creativity. The Free Press.
 Schmitt, B. (1999). Experiential marketing: How to get customers to sense, feel, think, act and relate to your company and brands. New York: The Free Press
 Schmitt, B. H. and Simonson, A. (1997). Marketing aesthetics: The strategic management of brands, identity and image. New York: The Free Press.

External links 
 MeetSchmitt.com
 Bernd Schmitt at Columbia University
 Bernd Schmitt, Executive Director of Institute on Asian Consumer Insight (ACI)
 Bernd Schmitt Youtube

Columbia University faculty
Columbia Business School faculty
Living people
1957 births
Place of birth missing (living people)